A stream is a continuous body of surface water flowing within the bed and banks of a channel. Depending on its location or certain characteristics, a stream may be referred to by a variety of local or regional names. Long large streams are usually called rivers, while smaller, less voluminous and more intermittent streams are known as streamlets, brooks or creeks.

The flow of a stream is controlled by three inputs – surface runoff (from precipitation or meltwater), daylighted subterranean water, and surfaced groundwater (spring water). The surface and subterranean water are highly variable between periods of rainfall. Groundwater, on the other hand, has a relatively constant input and is controlled more by long-term patterns of precipitation. The stream encompasses surface, subsurface and groundwater fluxes that respond to geological, geomorphological, hydrological and biotic controls.

Streams are important as conduits in the water cycle, instruments in groundwater recharge, and corridors for fish and wildlife migration. The biological habitat in the immediate vicinity of a stream is called a riparian zone. Given the status of the ongoing Holocene extinction, streams play an important corridor role in connecting fragmented habitats and thus in conserving biodiversity. The study of streams and waterways in general is known as surface hydrology and is a core element of environmental geography.

Types

Brook
A stream smaller than a creek, especially one that is fed by a spring or seep. It is usually small and easily forded. A brook is characterised by its shallowness.

Creek
A creek or crick:
 In Australia, Canada, New Zealand and the United States, a (narrow) stream that is smaller than a river; a minor tributary of a river; a brook. Sometimes navigable by motor craft and may be intermittent.
 In the United Kingdom, India, and parts of Maryland, New England,  a tidal inlet, typically in a salt marsh or mangrove swamp, or between enclosed and drained former salt marshes or swamps (e.g. Portsbridge Creek separating Portsea Island from the mainland). In these cases, the "stream" is the tidal stream, the course of the seawater through the creek channel at low and high tide.

River
A river is a large natural stream that is much wider and deeper than a creek and not easily fordable, and may be a navigable waterway.

Runnel
The linear channel between the parallel ridges or bars on a shoreline beach or river floodplain, or between a bar and the shore. Also called a swale.

Tributary
A tributary is a contributory stream to a larger stream, or a stream which does not reach a static body of water such as a lake, bay or ocean but joins another river (a parent river). Sometimes also called a branch or fork.

Distributary
A distributary, or a distributary channel, is a stream that branches off and flows away from a main stream channel, and the phenomenon is known as river bifurcation. Distributaries are common features of river deltas, and are often found where a valleyed stream enters wide flatlands or approaches the coastal plains around a lake or an ocean. They can also occur inland, on alluvial fans, or where a tributary stream bifurcates as it nears its confluence with a larger stream. Common terms for individual river distributaries in English-speaking countries are arm and channel.

Other names
There are a number of regional names for a stream.

Northern America
 Branch is used to name streams in Maryland and Virginia.
 Creek is common throughout the United States, as well as Australia.
 Falls is also used to name streams in Maryland, for streams/rivers which have waterfalls on them, even if such falls only have a small vertical drop. Little Gunpowder Falls and the Jones Falls are actually rivers named in this manner, unique to Maryland.
 Kill in New York, Pennsylvania, Delaware, and New Jersey comes from a Dutch language word meaning "riverbed" or "water channel", and can also be used for the UK meaning of 'creek'.
 Run in Ohio, Maryland, Michigan, New Jersey, Pennsylvania, Virginia, or West Virginia can be the name of a stream.
 Run in Florida is the name given to streams coming out of small natural springs. River is used for streams from larger springs like the Silver River and Rainbow River.
 Stream and brook are used in Midwestern states, Mid-Atlantic states, and New England.

United Kingdom
 Allt is used in the Scottish Highlands.
 Beck is used in Lincolnshire to Cumbria in areas which were once occupied by the Danes and Norwegians.
 Bourne or winterbourne is used in the chalk downland of southern England for ephemeral rivers. When permanent, they are chalk streams.
 Brook.
 Burn is used in Scotland and North East England.
 Gill or ghyll is seen in the north of England and Kent and Surrey influenced by Old Norse. The variant "ghyll" is used in the Lake District and appears to have been an invention of William Wordsworth.
 Nant is used in Wales.
  Rivulet is a term encountered in Victorian era publications.
 Stream
 Syke is used in the Scottish Lowlands and Cumbria for a seasonal stream.

Other terminology
 Bar A shoal that develops in a stream as sediment is deposited as the current slows or is impeded by wave action at the confluence.
 Bifurcation A fork into two or more streams.
 Channel A depression created by constant erosion that carries the stream's flow.
 Confluence The point at which the two streams merge. If the two tributaries are of approximately equal size, the confluence may be called a fork.
 Drainage basin (also known as a watershed in the United States) The area of land where water flows into a stream. A large drainage basin such as the Amazon River contains many smaller drainage basins.
 Floodplain Lands adjacent to the stream that are subject to flooding when a stream overflows its banks.
 Headwaters or source The part of a stream or river proximate to its source. The word is most commonly used in the plural where there is no single point source.
 Knickpoint The point on a stream's profile where a sudden change in stream gradient occurs.
 Mouth The point at which the stream discharges, possibly via an estuary or delta, into a static body of water such as a lake or ocean.
 Pool A segment where the water is deeper and slower moving.
 Rapids A turbulent, fast-flowing stretch of a stream or river.
 Riffle A segment where the flow is shallower and more turbulent.
 River A large natural stream, which may be a waterway.
 Run A somewhat smoothly flowing segment of the stream.
 Spring The point at which a stream emerges from an underground course through unconsolidated sediments or through caves. A stream can, especially with caves, flow aboveground for part of its course, and underground for part of its course.
 Stream bed The bottom of a stream.
 Stream corridor Stream, its floodplains, and the transitional upland fringe<ref>"Stream Corridor Structure"  Adapted from Stream Corridor Restoration: Principles, Processes, and Practices</ref>
 Streamflow The water moving through a stream channel.: Stream gauge: A site along the route of a stream or river, used for reference marking or water monitoring.
 Thalweg The river's longitudinal section, or the line joining the deepest point in the channel at each stage from source to mouth.
 Watercourse The channel followed by a stream (a flowing body of water) or the stream itself. In the UK, some aspects of criminal law, such as the Rivers (Prevention of Pollution) Act 1951, specify that a watercourse includes those rivers which are dry for part of the year. In some jurisdictions, owners of land over which the water flows may have the legal right to use or retain some or much of that water. This right may extend to estuaries, rivers, streams, anabranches and canals.
 Waterfall or cascade The fall of water where the stream goes over a sudden drop called a knickpoint; some knickpoints are formed by erosion when water flows over an especially resistant stratum, followed by one less so. The stream expends kinetic energy in "trying" to eliminate the knickpoint.
 Wetted perimeter The line on which the stream's surface meets the channel walls.

Sources

A stream's source depends on the surrounding landscape and its function within larger river networks. While perennial and intermittent streams are typically supplied by smaller upstream waters and groundwater, headwater and ephemeral streams often derive most of their water from precipitation in the form of rain and snow. Most of this precipitated water re-enters the atmosphere by evaporation from soil and water bodies, or by the evapotranspiration of plants. Some of the water proceeds to sink into the earth by infiltration and becomes groundwater, much of which eventually enters streams.  Some precipitated water is temporarily locked up in snow fields and glaciers, to be released later by evaporation or melting.  The rest of the water flows off the land as runoff, the proportion of which varies according to many factors, such as wind, humidity, vegetation, rock types, and relief. This runoff starts as a thin film called sheet wash, combined with a network of tiny rills, together constituting sheet runoff; when this water is concentrated in a channel, a stream has its birth. Some creeks may start from ponds or lakes.

Characteristics
Ranking
To qualify as a stream, a body of water must be either recurring or perennial. Recurring (intermittent) streams have water in the channel for at least part of the year. A stream of the first order is a stream which does not have any other recurring or perennial stream feeding into it. When two first-order streams come together, they form a second-order stream. When two second-order streams come together, they form a third-order stream. Streams of lower order joining a higher order stream do not change the order of the higher stream. 

Gradient
The gradient of a stream is a critical factor in determining its character and is entirely determined by its base level of erosion. The base level of erosion is the point at which the stream either enters the ocean, a lake or pond, or enters a stretch in which it has a much lower gradient, and may be specifically applied to any particular stretch of a stream.

In geological terms, the stream will erode down through its bed to achieve the base level of erosion throughout its course. If this base level is low, then the stream will rapidly cut through underlying strata and have a steep gradient, and if the base level is relatively high, then the stream will form a flood plain and meander.

Meander
Meanders are looping changes of direction of a stream caused by the erosion and deposition of bank materials.  These are typically serpentine in form. Typically, over time the meanders gradually migrate downstream. If some resistant material slows or stops the downstream movement of a meander, a stream may erode through the neck between two legs of a meander to become temporarily straighter, leaving behind an arc-shaped body of water termed an oxbow lake or bayou.  A flood may also cause a meander to be cut through in this way.

Profile
Typically, streams are said to have a particular profile, beginning with steep gradients, no flood plain, and little shifting of channels, eventually evolving into streams with low gradients, wide flood plains, and extensive meanders. The initial stage is sometimes termed a "young" or "immature" stream, and the later state a "mature" or "old" stream.

Stream load
The stream load is defined as the solid matter carried by a stream. Streams can carry sediment, or alluvium. The amount of load it can carry (capacity) as well as the largest object it can carry (competence) are both dependent on the velocity of the stream.

Perennial and non-perennial
Perennial streams
A perennial stream is one which flows continuously all year. Some perennial streams may only have continuous flow in segments of its stream bed year round during years of normal rainfall. Blue-line streams are perennial streams and are marked on topographic maps with a solid blue line.

Non-perennial streams

Ephemeral stream
Generally, streams that flow only during and immediately after precipitation are termed ephemeral. There is no clear demarcation between surface runoff and an ephemeral stream, and some ephemeral streams can be classed as intermittent—flow all but disappearing in the normal course of seasons but ample flow (backups) restoring stream presence  such circumstances are documented when stream beds have opened up a path into mines or other underground chambers.

According to official U.S. definitions, the channels of intermittent streams are well-defined, as opposed to ephemeral streams, which may or may not have a defined channel, and rely mainly on storm runoff, as their aquatic bed is above the water table. An ephemeral stream does not have the biological, hydrological, and physical characteristics of a continuous or intermittent stream. The same non-perennial channel might change characteristics from intermittent to ephemeral over its course.

Intermittent or seasonal stream

Washes can fill up quickly during rains, and there may be a sudden torrent of water after a thunderstorm begins upstream, such as during monsoonal conditions. In the United States, an intermittent or seasonal stream is one that only flows for part of the year and is marked on topographic maps with a line of blue dashes and dots. A wash, desert wash, or arroyo'' is normally a dry streambed in the deserts of the American Southwest, which flows after sufficient rainfall.

In Italy, an intermittent stream is termed a torrent. In full flood the stream may or may not be "torrential" in the dramatic sense of the word, but there will be one or more seasons in which the flow is reduced to a trickle or less. Typically torrents have Apennine rather than Alpine sources, and in the summer they are fed by little precipitation and no melting snow. In this case the maximum discharge will be during the spring and autumn. 

An intermittent stream can also be called a winterbourne in Britain or a wadi in the Arabic-speaking world. In Australia, an intermittent stream is usually called a creek and marked on topographic maps with a solid blue line.

Drainage basins
The extent of land basin drained by a stream is termed its drainage basin (also known in North America as the watershed and, in British English, as a catchment). A basin may also be composed of smaller basins.  For instance, the Continental Divide in North America divides the mainly easterly-draining Atlantic Ocean and Arctic Ocean basins from the largely westerly-flowing Pacific Ocean basin. The Atlantic Ocean basin, however, may be further subdivided into the Atlantic Ocean and Gulf of Mexico drainages. (This delineation is termed the Eastern Continental Divide.) Similarly, the Gulf of Mexico basin may be divided into the Mississippi River basin and several smaller basins, such as the Tombigbee River basin. Continuing in this vein, a component of the Mississippi River basin is the Ohio River basin, which in turn includes the Kentucky River basin, and so forth.

Crossings
Stream crossings are where streams are crossed by roads, pipelines, railways, or any other thing which might restrict the flow of the stream in ordinary or flood conditions. Any structure over or in a stream which results in limitations on the movement of fish or other ecological elements may be an issue.

See also
 Aqueduct (water supply)
 Environmental flow
 Head cut
 Playfair's Law
 River ecosystem
 Rock-cut basin

References

External links

 Glossary of stream-related terms, StreamNet

 
Bodies of water
Fluvial landforms
Geomorphology
Hydrology
Rivers